Nemes is a Hungarian surname meaning "noble". Notable people with the surname include:

 Sámuel Literáti Nemes (1796–1842), Transylvanian-Hungarian antiquarian
 Marcell Nemes (1866–1930), Hungarian financier, art collector and art dealer
 Oszkár Abay-Nemes (1913–1959), Hungarian swimmer
 Graciela Palau de Nemes (born 1919), critic of Latin American literature
 Les Nemes (born 1960), English bass player
 Laszlo Nemes (born 1977), Hungarian film director
 Jason Nemes (born 1978), American politician

Surnames
Hungarian-language surnames
Surnames of Hungarian origin